The National Treasury Administration (NTA) is the agency of the Ministry of Finance of Taiwan (ROC) in charge of relevant matters in the revenues, expenditures and management of the Treasury as well as responsible for the management of government debt, fiscal planning, public welfare lottery, and the management of public-owned enterprises.

History
The National Treasury Administration was originally established as National Treasury Department  under the Ministry of Finance in the early years of the Republic of China. On 26 March 1940, the department was then upgraded to National Treasury Administration and the Organizational Act of the National Treasury Administration was promulgated on the same day. At that time, the administration consisted of 4 sections and 1 office. On 10 February 1942, the organizational act was amended and promulgated which resulted in the expansion of the administration to become 6 sections and 2 offices. On 22 July 1981, the organizational act was amended and promulgated again.

Organizational structure  
 Treasury Affairs Management Division
 Treasury Disbursement Management Division
 Debt Management Division
 Financial Planning Division
 Government -Owned Shares Management Division
 Tobacco and Alcohol Management Division
 Secretariat
 Accounting and Statistics Office
 Personnel Office
 Civil Service Ethics Office
 Information Management Office

Director-Generals
 Joanne Ling
 Hsiao Chia-chi

Transportation
NTA is accessible from Jingmei Station of the Taipei Metro.

See also
 Ministry of Finance (Taiwan)

References

External links

 

1940 establishments in China
Executive Yuan
Government agencies established in 1940
Government of Taiwan